is a Prefectural Natural Park in Nagasaki Prefecture, Japan. The park was established in 1966.

See also
 National Parks of Japan
 Nomo Hantō Prefectural Natural Park

References

Parks and gardens in Nagasaki Prefecture
Protected areas established in 1966
1966 establishments in Japan